Brenda Lee Eisler (born October 16, 1951 in Calgary, Alberta) is a retired long jumper from Canada. She took home a bronze medal from the Pacific Conference Games in 1969. She won the gold medal at the 1971 Pan American Games, and competed for her native country at the 1972 Summer Olympics in Munich, West Germany. In 1974 she won the silver medal in the long jump at the Commonwealth Games in Christchurch, New Zealand.

References
 

1951 births
Living people
Canadian female long jumpers
Olympic track and field athletes of Canada
Athletes (track and field) at the 1972 Summer Olympics
Pan American Games medalists in athletics (track and field)
Athletes (track and field) at the 1971 Pan American Games
Commonwealth Games medallists in athletics
Athletes (track and field) at the 1970 British Commonwealth Games
Athletes (track and field) at the 1974 British Commonwealth Games
Athletes from Calgary
Pan American Games gold medalists for Canada
Commonwealth Games silver medallists for Canada
Universiade medalists in athletics (track and field)
Universiade bronze medalists for Canada
Medalists at the 1973 Summer Universiade
Medalists at the 1971 Pan American Games
Medallists at the 1974 British Commonwealth Games